Twenty-two ships of the French Navy have borne the name Galatée or Galathée, in honour of Galatea:

Ships named Galatée 
 , a frigate 
 , a 24-gun frigate, lead ship of her class 
 , a 32-gun frigate, lead ship of her class 
  (1800), a 20-gun corvette, better known as Géographe 
 , a 30-gun corvette 
 , a  launched in 1925 and sunk in 1944
 , a  completed in 1964 and decommissioned in 1991

Ships named Galathée 
 , a 20-gun frigate 
 , a 28-gun frigate 
 , a 46-gun Consolante-class frigate

See also

Notes and references
Notes

References

Bibliography
 
 

French Navy ship names